Harold William Taylor (18 November 1902–1963) was an English footballer who played in the Football League for Bradford Park Avenue, Southport and Stockport County.

References

1902 births
1963 deaths
English footballers
Association football midfielders
English Football League players
Bradford (Park Avenue) A.F.C. players
Southport F.C. players
Oldham Athletic A.F.C. players
Stockport County F.C. players
Chesterfield F.C. players